Krosno is a town in south-eastern Poland.

Krosno may also refer to:

Krosno Odrzańskie, a town in Lubusz Voivodeship (west Poland)
Krosno, Podlaskie Voivodeship (north-east Poland)
Krosno, Łódź Voivodeship (central Poland)
Krosno, Poznań County in Greater Poland Voivodeship (west-central Poland)
Krosno, Wągrowiec County in Greater Poland Voivodeship (west-central Poland)
Krosno, Elbląg County in Warmian-Masurian Voivodeship (north Poland)
Krosno, Lidzbark County in Warmian-Masurian Voivodeship (north Poland)

See also
Krosino (disambiguation)